The second series of the BBC family sitcom My Family originally aired between 31 August and 30 November 2001. The second series was commissioned after good ratings from the first series. The opening episode, "All Roads Lead To Ramon", re-introduces the five main characters from the first series, with the addition of Brian, played by Kevin Bishop, who appeared in nearly every episode in the series. All thirteen episodes in series two are thirty minutes in length. The series was produced by Rude Boy Productions, a company that produces comedies created by Fred Barron. The series was filmed at Pinewood Studios in London, in front of a live audience.

Episode information

Reception

Viewers
Upon the success of appearing in a prime-time Friday evening slot, the second series was given the same slot for the majority of episodes. The series continued to be a hit with viewers, with the first episode of the series gaining 8.95 million viewers, the second highest rating for the week. The second series averaged 10.38 million viewers for each episode.

References

External links
My Family: Series Two at the British Comedy Guide
My Family: Series Two at My Family Online
BBC Comedy- My Family Series 2

2001 British television seasons